Matthew Camp (born March 15, 1984) is an American adult performer, model, internet personality, and artist. Camp came to prominence in 2013 with Getting Go: The Go Doc Project. In 2020, Camp was co-host of the reality television competition series Slag Wars.

Biography 
Matthew Camp began his career as a go-go dancer in New York City bars at the age of 21. He is the protagonist of documentary project “Camp Chaos”, created by Corey Krueckeberg.

Camp has modeled for underwear brands as well as created fragrance and clothing lines, including "Matthew Camp Designs" and "Daddy Couture", a collaboration with Rebecca More. Camp was featured on the cover of the British gay magazine Attitude in 2019.

Camp is also known for being an LGBTQ+ and sex positivity activist. About 2018, when the club scene continued to slow down in New York, Camp moved to Hudson, New York and created an account on OnlyFans. Camp's Instagram account has more than half a million followers.

Camp was the victim of a suspected hate crime attack in early 2021. His house in Poughkeepsie was the target of an arson attack on January 14, while the perpetrator was captured on security cameras spreading the fire accelerant on the porch and setting the house ablaze.

Filmography

References

External links 
 Matthew Camp on men.com
 

1984 births
American male erotic dancers
American male adult models
Living people
People from Poughkeepsie, New York
People from Santa Clara, California
Pornographic film actors from New York (state)
OnlyFans creators
American LGBT entertainers